Faith Fighter is a Flash fighting game developed by the Italian website Molleindustria
in which players fight as religious figures such as Gautama Buddha, Jesus or Muhammad and must fight Xenu after beating all playable characters.

The game was temporarily withdrawn from its hosting web site in late April 2009, in response to protests from the Islamophobia Observatory of the Organisation of the Islamic Conference In response, the game's creators posted a sequel to the game with the figure of Muhammad's face censored, in which the player must bestow "love" by clicking on each religious figure in turn: without this action, the figures slowly fade away. The original game has since been reposted on the maker's website.

In Brazil, Universo Online was forced to remove the game from its servers following a judicial ruling, in a case sponsored by a mosque in Barretos, São Paulo state.

References

External links
Faith Fighter at Molleindustria
Faith Fighter at Newgrounds

2009 video games
Censored video games
Video games developed in Italy
Cultural depictions of Muhammad
Cultural depictions of Jesus
Cultural depictions of Gautama Buddha
Ganesha in popular culture
Video games about God
Video games about religion
Scientology and the Internet
Xenu